Capnodis is a genus of beetles in the family Buprestidae, containing the following species:

 Capnodis anthracina (Fischer von Waldheim, 1830)
 Capnodis antiqua Heer, 1847
 Capnodis carbonaria (Klug, 1829)
 Capnodis cariosa (Pallas, 1776)
 Capnodis excisa Menetries, 1849
 Capnodis henningii (Faldermann, 1835)
 Capnodis indica Thomson, 1879
 Capnodis jacobsoni Richter, 1952
 Capnodis marquardti Reitter, 1913
 Capnodis miliaris (Klug, 1829)
 Capnodis parumstriata Ballion, 1871
 Capnodis porosa (Klug, 1829)
 Capnodis puncticollis Heer, 1847
 Capnodis semisuturalis Marseul, 1865
 Capnodis sexmaculata Ballion, 1871
 Capnodis spectabilis Heer, 1862
 Capnodis tenebricosa (Olivier, 1790)
 Capnodis tenebrionis (Linnaeus, 1761)

References

Buprestidae genera
Taxa named by Johann Friedrich von Eschscholtz